The R502 road is a regional road in Ireland. It links the R433 at a point approximately 1 km from Templemore, County Tipperary and the R639 at Johnstown, County Kilkenny where it joins the R435. It passes through Templetuohy, County Tipperary.

See also
Roads in Ireland
National primary road
National secondary road

References
Roads Act 1993 (Classification of Regional Roads) Order 2006 – Department of Transport

Regional roads in the Republic of Ireland
Roads in County Tipperary
Roads in County Kilkenny